Sheraton Grand Seattle is a high-rise hotel in Seattle, in the U.S. state of Washington. The hotel is operated by Sheraton Hotels and Resorts, which is owned by Marriott International. The 35-floor building was built in 1982 and renovated in 2011.

The hotel is among the largest in Seattle, with 1,236 guest rooms as of 2020. Sheraton Grand Seatltle unveiled a $60 million renovation, which included a Starbucks shop, in 2018. The hotel hosts a Gingerbread Village annually. The restaurant  Loulay Kitchen and Bar has operated in the building.

References

External links 

 
 Sheraton Grand Seattle at Marriott.com

1982 establishments in Washington (state)
Buildings and structures completed in 1982
Hotels in Seattle
Sheraton hotels